Khalafiat (also Romanized as Khalāfīāt, Khalāfeyāt, Khallāfeyāt, and Khallāfīāt; also known as Khalafia) is a village in Jarahi Rural District, in the Central District of Mahshahr County, Khuzestan Province, Iran. At the 2006 census, its population was 35, in 7 families.

References 

Populated places in Mahshahr County